Casa dolce casa (Home sweet home) is an Italian sitcom.

Cast

Gianfranco D'Angelo: Marco Bonetti
Alida Chelli: Sofia
Daniela D'Angelo: Chiara Bonetti
Oreste Di Domenico: Giulio Bonetti
Enzo Garinei: Pietro
Wendy Windham: Julie

See also
List of Italian television series

Recording studios
The series was filmed in the Link Up Studies in Milan.

External links
 

Italian television series
1992 Italian television series debuts
1994 Italian television series endings
Canale 5 original programming